Nameless Woman (German: Die Frau ohne Namen) is a 1927 German silent adventure film directed by  Georg Jacoby and starring  Elga Brink, Jack Trevor and Georg Alexander. It was released in two parts. A pair of American journalists embark on a world-wide tour in which they enjoy many adventures.

It was shot at the EFA Studios in Berlin and on location in the United States and East Asia. The film's sets were designed by Franz Schroedter and Hermann Warm.

Cast
 Elga Brink as Violett Jeffrey 
 Jack Trevor as Frank Milton 
 Georg Alexander as Bobby Dix 
 Marietta Millner as Vivian Ried 
 Stewart Rome as Bareira 
 Georg Baselt as editor 
 Willi Schaeffers as head clerk 
 Paul Biensfeldt as consul
 Nien Soen Ling as the Chinese
 Jakob Tiedtke as a rich Korean
 Magnus Stifter

References

External links
 
 

1927 films
1927 adventure films
German adventure films
Films of the Weimar Republic
German silent feature films
Films directed by Georg Jacoby
1920s chase films
Films about journalists
German black-and-white films
Silent adventure films
Silent thriller films
Films shot at Halensee Studios
1920s German films